Dennis Marty Brown (born July 25, 1965) is an American country music artist. Active between 1991 and 1996, he has released six studio albums and has charted one single on the Billboard Hot Country Songs charts. Marty Brown and his wife, Shellie, currently reside in Simpson County, Franklin, Kentucky, since July 2004.

Career
Brown's first recording contract was with MCA Records in 1991. While on that label, he recorded three studio albums: 1991's High and Dry, 1993's Wild Kentucky Skies, and 1994's Cryin', Lovin', Leavin'''. Although all three of these albums received critical acclaim for his neotraditionalist country style and solid songwriting, none of them produced any major hits. His fourth studio album, Here's to the Honky Tonks, was released in 1996 on HighTone Records.  He also co-wrote Tracy Byrd's "I'm from the Country", Perfect Stranger's "The Hits", Trace Adkins' "When I Stop Loving You", Brooks & Dunn' "It Ain't Me If It Ain't You", and William Michael Morgan' "I Pulled a Hank".

Brown was a contestant on season eight of America's Got Talent and advanced as far as the semi-final rounds.  After competing on America's Got Talent'', he signed a record deal with Independent Label, Dreamlined Entertainment. His new single, Make You Feel My Love, was available for download on February 5, 2016. Brown is currently signed to Plowboy Records in Nashville. Brown released his first studio album in 25 years, American Highway on May 17, 2019.  Marty Brown's music career is currently on display at the Kentucky Music Hall of Fame in Mt. Vernon, Kentucky.

Discography

Albums

Singles

Music videos

References

1965 births
21st-century American singers
20th-century American singers
American country singer-songwriters
Country musicians from Kentucky
Living people
MCA Records artists
America's Got Talent contestants
Singer-songwriters from Kentucky
People from Daviess County, Kentucky